"Accidents Will Happen" is a song by Elvis Costello.

Accidents Will Happen may also refer to:

Accidents Will Happen (film), 1938 film
"Accidents Will Happen", song by Bing Crosby from film Mr. Music 1950
"Accidents Will Happen" (Degrassi: The Next Generation)
 "Accidents Will Happen" (SpongeBob SquarePants), an episode of SpongeBob SquarePants